Jurģi is an ancient Latvian festival.

Jurgi may also refer to the following villages in Poland:
Jurgi, Masovian Voivodeship (east-central Poland)
Jurgi, Warmian-Masurian Voivodeship (north Poland)